A Chau is a small uninhabited island in the inner most of Starling Inlet (Sha Tau Kok Hoi), off Nam Chung, in the north-eastern New Territories of Hong Kong. It is under the administration of North District, and falls within the Closed Area.

Fauna
A Chau has been designated as a Site of Special Scientific Interest since 1985. The fauna of the island includes night heron, little egret, great egret, black-headed gull and herring gull. It is also a breeding site for the passage migrants. It was reported in 2007 that A Chau was the largest egretry in Hong Kong and may also have been one of the most important night roosting sites for the ardeids in winter.

See also
 List of islands and peninsulas of Hong Kong
 Yim Tso Ha

References

Uninhabited islands of Hong Kong
North District, Hong Kong
Islands of Hong Kong